Diego Avila (born February 23, 1980 in Córdoba) is a field hockey midfielder from Argentina, who was a member of the Men's National Team that competed at the 2003 Champions Trophy in Amstelveen, Netherlands. He played club hockey for Cordóba HC in his home town.

External links 
  Interview with Diego Avila

1980 births
Argentine male field hockey players
Living people
Sportspeople from Córdoba, Argentina